Vachellia oerfota is a perennial shrub or tree which is native to Africa, Asia and the Middle East.  Among other things, it is used in making beverages. It grows 1–5m high. It is an important legume tree commonly browsed by goats and camels in Africa. It is valued as a fodder by pastoralists.

References

oerfota
Shrubs
Trees of Africa